William Fly (died 12 July 1726) was an English pirate who raided New England shipping fleets for three months in 1726 until he was captured by the crew of a seized ship. He was hanged in Boston, Massachusetts and his body publicly exhibited as a warning to other pirates. His death is considered by many to mark the end of the Golden Age of Piracy.

Career
William Fly's career as a pirate began in April 1726, when he signed on to sail with Captain John Green to West Africa on the Elizabeth. Green and Fly began to clash until one night Fly led a mutiny that resulted in Green being tossed overboard; Fly then took command of the Elizabeth.  Having captured the ship, the mutineers sewed a Jolly Roger flag, renamed the ship Fames' Revenge, elected Fly as captain, and sailed to the coast of North Carolina and north toward New England. They captured five ships in about two months before being captured themselves. Following Fly's capture, Cotton Mather tried and failed to get Fly to publicly repent.

William Fly and his crew were hanged at Boston Harbor on 12 July 1726. Reportedly, Fly approached the hanging with complete disdain and even reproached the hangman for doing a poor job, re-tying the noose and placing it about his neck with his own two hands. His last words were, roughly, a warning to captains to treat their sailors well and pay them on time – "Our Captain and his Mate used us Barbarously. We poor Men can’t have Justice done us. There is nothing said to our Commanders, let them never so much abuse us, and use us like Dogs." Fly urged that "all Masters of Vessels might take Warning of the Fate of the Captain that he had murder'd, and to pay Sailors their Wages when due." Following Fly's execution, his body was hung in chains (gibbeted) on Nixes Mate Island in Boston Harbor as a warning to others not to turn to piracy.

References

Further reading
Flemming, Gregory. At the Point of a Cutlass: The Pirate Capture, Bold Escape, and Lonely Exile of Philip Ashton. ForeEdge (2014) 
Marcus Rediker, "Villains of All Nations: Atlantic Pirates in the Golden Age", Beacon Press, 2004
Lyons Press, "The History of the Lives and Bloody Exploits of the Most Noted Pirates: Their Trials and Executions", Lyons Press, 2004 ed.
Capt. Charles Johnson, "A General History of the Robberies and Murders of the Most Notorious Pirates", 1724
 See the chapter "The Vial Poured out Upon the Sea" from Daniel E. Williams Pillars of Salt. (Madison: Madison House Press, 1993; pgs 110 - 117) for a description of William Fly's execution.

External links
Pirates, Privateers, Buccaneers, & Swashbucklers
New England Pirate Museum: William Fly
Seven Oceans: Captain William Fly
Pirates hold: William Fly
The Pirate and the Gallows: An Atlantic Theater of Terror and Resistance, by Marcus Rediker

British pirates
Year of birth missing
1726 deaths
People executed by the Province of Massachusetts Bay
Executed English people
People executed for piracy
People executed by the Thirteen Colonies by hanging
People executed by Massachusetts by hanging
18th-century English people
18th-century pirates